This is a list of European colonial administrators responsible for the territory of Ruanda-Urundi, an area equivalent to modern-day Rwanda and Burundi. Ruanda-Urundi formed part of German East Africa until it was captured by Belgian forces during World War I. After that, the territory became a Class B League of Nations mandate, and later a United Nations trust territory, under the administration of Belgium, until 1962 when the constituent parts of the territory became independent.

German rule

Military District of Ujiji

Military District of Usumbura

Military Residency of Urundi and Ruanda

On 15 November 1907, the Military Residency of Urundi and Ruanda was divided into two civil residencies: Ruanda and Urundi.

Belgian rule

Territories south of Lake Victoria (including Northern Ruanda)

Territories east of Lake Kivu and Lake Tanganyika (including Southern Ruanda and Urundi)

Occupied East African territories

Ruanda-Urundi mandate / trust territory

On 1 July 1962, the constituent parts of Ruanda-Urundi became independent as the Republic of Rwanda (République du Rwanda) and the Kingdom of Burundi (Royaume du Burundi), respectively.

See also
Minister of the Colonies (Belgium)
List of colonial governors of the Congo Free State and Belgian Congo
List of kings of Rwanda
List of presidents of Rwanda
List of kings of Burundi
List of presidents of Burundi

Notes

External links
World Statesmen – Ruanda-Urundi

Ruanda-Urundi, Colonial governors of
Burundi history-related lists
Rwanda history-related lists